Mark Stewart is the third album by British singer Mark Stewart, released in 1987 through Mute Records.

Track listing

Personnel 
The Maffia
Keith LeBlanc – drums
Skip McDonald – guitar
Adrian Sherwood – keyboards, production
Doug Wimbish – bass guitar
Mark Stewart – vocals, production

Charts

References

External links 
 

1987 albums
Albums produced by Adrian Sherwood
Mute Records albums
Mark Stewart (English musician) albums